The Oregon State Senate is the upper house of the statewide legislature for the US state of Oregon. Along with the lower chamber Oregon House of Representatives it makes up the Oregon Legislative Assembly. There are 30 members of the state Senate, representing 30 districts across the state, each with a population of 127,700. The state Senate meets in the east wing of the Oregon State Capitol in Salem.

Oregon state senators serve four-year terms without term limits. In 2002, the Oregon Supreme Court struck down the decade-old Oregon Ballot Measure 3, that had restricted state senators to two terms (eight years) on procedural grounds.

Like certain other upper houses of state and territorial legislatures and the United States Senate, the state Senate can confirm or reject gubernatorial appointments to state departments, commissions, boards, and other state governmental agencies.

The current Senate president is Rob Wagner of Lake Oswego.

Oregon, along with Arizona, Maine, New Hampshire, and Wyoming, is one of the five U.S. states to not have the office of the lieutenant governor, a position which for most upper houses of state legislatures and for the United States Congress (with the vice president) is the head of the legislative body and holder of the casting vote in the event of a tie. Instead, a separate position of Senate president is in place, removed from the state executive branch. If the chamber is tied, legislators must devise their own methods of resolving the impasse. In 2002, for example, Oregon's state senators entered into a power sharing contract whereby Democratic senators nominated the Senate President while Republican senators chaired key committees.

Milestones 
Kathryn Clarke was the first woman to serve in Oregon's Senate. Women became eligible to run for the Oregon state legislature in 1914 and later that year Clarke was appointed to fill a vacant seat in Douglas county by her cousin, governor Oswald West. Following some controversy concerning whether West had the authority to appoint someone to fill the vacancy, Clarke campaigned and was elected by voters in 1915. She took office five years before Nineteenth Amendment to the United States Constitution protected the right of all American women to vote.

In 1982, Mae Yih became the first Chinese-American elected to a state senate in the United States.

Composition

82nd Senate

The 82nd Oregon Legislative Assembly, which holds its regular session from 2023 to 2025, has the following leadership:

Senate President: Rob Wagner (D-19 Lake Oswego)
President Pro Tempore: James Manning Jr. (D–7 Eugene)
Majority Leader: Kate Lieber (D-14 Beaverton)
Minority Leader: Tim Knopp (R-27 Bend)

82nd Senate Committee Assignments 
Senators are each assigned to one or more committees.

Conduct

 Dick Anderson - Co-Chair
 Floyd Prozanski – Co-Chair
 Suzanne Weber
 Aaron Woods
 Michael Dembrow
 Lynn Findley
 Jeff Golden
 Bill Hansell
 Tim Knopp
 Deb Patterson

Education

 Michael Dembrow – Chair
 Suzanne Weber – Vice-Chair
 Dick Anderson
 Lew Frederick
 Sara Gelser Blouin
 Art Robinson
 Rob Wagner

Energy and Environment

 Janeen Sollman – Chair
 Lynn Findley – Vice-Chair
 Jeff Golden
 Cedric Hayden
 Kate Lieber

Finance and Revenue

 Mark Meek – Chair
 Brian Boquist – Vice-Chair
 Lynn Findley
 Jeff Golden
 Kayse Jama

Health Care

 Deb Patterson – Chair
 Cedric Hayden – Vice-Chair
 Daniel Bonham
 Wlnsvey Campos
 Chris Gorsek

Housing and Development

 Kayse Jama – Chair
 Dick Anderson – Vice-Chair
 Tim Knopp
 Deb Patterson
 Janeen Sollman

Human Services

 Sara Gelser Blouin – Chair
 Art Robinson – Vice-Chair
 James Manning Jr.
 Floyd Prozanski
 Suzanne Weber

Judiciary

 Floyd Prozanski – Chair
 Kim Thatcher – Vice-Chair
 Michael Dembrow
 Sara Gelser Blouin
 Dennis Linthicum
 James Manning Jr.

Labor and Business

 Kathleen Taylor – Chair
 Daniel Bonham – Vice-Chair
 Bill Hansell
 Kayse Jama
 Deb Patterson

Natural Resources

 Jeff Golden – Chair
 Fred Girod – Vice-Chair
 Floyd Prozanski
 David Brock Smith
 Kathleen Taylor

Rules

 Kate Lieber – Chair
 Tim Knopp – Vice-Chair
 Bill Hansell
 James Manning Jr.
 Elizabeth Steiner

Veterans, Emergency Management, Federal and World Affairs

 James Manning Jr. - Chair
 Kim Thatcher – Vice-Chair
 Chris Gorsek
 Art Robinson
 Aaron Woods

Past composition of the Senate

See also
 2022 Oregon State Senate election

Notes

References

External links
 Oregon state Senate
 Map of state Senate Districts
 Oregon Senate Democrats homepage

Senate
State upper houses in the United States
 
1859 establishments in Oregon